This list of schools in Abidjan includes the principal private and public schools in Abidjan, the economic capital of the Ivory Coast.

Preschool education
Includes schools designated in French as "Jardin d'enfant" and "école maternelle" :

Public preschools
 Centre de la petite enfance du programme 6 (Cocody)
 Centre de protection de la petite enfance (Cocody) 
 École maternelle Hoba Hélène (cocody riviéra palmeraie)
Centre de la petite enfance du programme (koumassi)

Private schools
 Institut  LKM de Yopougon
 École Maternelle La Rosette
 Groupe scolaire Arc-en-Ciel du Plateau Dokui
 École Les papillons II Plateaux
 Institut Libanais d'Enseignement (I.L.E.)
 Garderie Bébé Calin
 Groupe Scolaire DUBASS (Riviera-Faya, Route de Bingerville, Abidjan)

Primary education

Private primary schools
Groupe scolaire les Papillons - Abidjan 2plateaux

 Complexe Educatif Marie Auzey cocody Angre ecole prescolaire et primaire
 Groupe scolaire victoire
 (Yopougon)
 La Farandole Internationale, a Mission Laïque Française (MLF) school (French school)
 Institut LKM de Yopougon
 Lycée International Jean-Mermoz, A part of the MLF
Complexe Éducatif Marie Auzey (Cycle préscolaire et primaire)
  (école française)
 Cours Sévigné (école française)
 École du  (French school)
 École les sept nains
 École les pitchounes
 École Konan Raphael
 École primaire militaire
 École le nid de Cocody
 École la Volière de 
 École primaire de la pépinière de Cocody les Deux-Plateaux (French school)
 École primaire de l'eau vive Zone 4 (French school - Closed since November 2004)
 École internationale Jules Verne  (French school)
 Groupe scolaire Antoine de Saint-Exupéry de Yopougon
 Groupe scolaire Arc-en-Ciel du Plateau Dokui
 Groupe scolaire de Cocody-Riviera
 Groupe scolaire Jacques Prévert (French school)
 Groupe Scolaire DUBASS (Riviera-Faya, Route de Bingerville, Abidjan) 
 Groupe scolaire Offoumou de Yopougon
 Jeanifa school de Cocody-Angré
 Lycée Blaise Pascal
 Groupe scolaire Fred et Poppee (Cocody Djibi 8e Tranche)
 Groupe scolaire baptiste William Carrey (Port-Bouët)
 Groupe scolaire baptiste Grâce divine (Koumassi)
 Lycée Maurice Delafosse
 Institut Libanais d'Enseignement (I.L.E.)
 Groupe Scolaire Bilingue Les Papillons (Angré 7e)
 Groupe Scolaire les Anges Blancs Marcory
 Groupe Scolaire les Industriels Yopougon Zone Industrielle Micao
Groupe scolaire Alghadir Riviera
Groupe scolaire Alghadir Bietry
Ecole libanaise en Côte d'Ivoire zone4

Public primary schools
 EPP Marcory 1
 Collège Sainte Alliance (Koumassi)
 Ecole primaire  Cité
 Ecole primaire Vridi Chapelle
 École primaire Vridi Collectif
 École primaire Vridi Lagune
 Cours Castaing
 École Saint-Paul
 École Saint-Michel
 École Saint Jean Bosco de Treichville
 École Sainte-Anne de Port-Bouët
 Groupe Scolaire Gandhi Yopougon Toits Rouges
 Groupe Scolaire les Hirondelles Abobo Sagbé
 Victor Loba'd
 EPP Liberté Adjamé
 EPP Paillet Adjamé

Secondary education

Public collèges
(lower secondary schools, equivalent of British high school or US middle school)
 Collège du Plateau
 Collège Moderne de Yopougon
 Collège Jean-Mermoz
 Collège William Ponty
 Collège André Malraux
 Collège Anador d'Abobo
 Collège Victor Schœlcher
 Collège GSR Riviera Golf
 Collège BAD de Koumassi
 Collège moderne d'Adjamé
 Collège Newton de Yopougon
 Collège d'orientation de Cocody
 École Militaire Préparatoire Technique de Bingerville (EMPT)
 Collège « Les phalènes » de Yopougon
 Collège Anador d'Abobo
 Collège moderne de l'autoroute de Treichville
 Collège moderne d'Abobo
 Collège moderne du Plateau
 College moderne la colombe de koumassi
 College moderne pascal de koumassi

Private collèges
 La Farandole Internationale, a Mission laïque française (MLF) school (French school)
 Collège  Riviera 
 Collège Notre Dame d'Afrique de Bietry
 Collège Sainte Foi d'Abidjan
 Cours secondaire catholique petit séminaire de Bingerville
 Collège Guchanrolain de Yopougon
 Collège D BAZ de Yopougon - Andokoi
 Groupe scolaire EPD (Education.Paix.Développement) d'Abobo
 Cours secondaire méthodiste de Cocody
 Collège Voltaire Marcory
 Cours secondaire méthodiste du Plateaucollège collège la vendière
école nouvelle ivoirienne cocody angre (general Education lower secondary school)
 École Notre-Dame d'Afrique
 École Notre-Dame des Apôtres
 Collège Notre-Dame de la Paix du Plateau
 Collège privé shalom du Plateau
 Groupe scolaire Arc-en-Ciel du Plateau Dokui
 Collège Saba & fils de Yopougon Ananeraie
 
 Collège Voltaire Treichville
 Groupe Écoles Alfred Nobel Marcory
 Collège privé Bougainville
 Collège institut Froebel de Marcory
 Institut libanais d'enseignement (I.L.E.)
 INSTITUT SCOLAIRE SECONDAIRE ESSEGOU AKA ABOBO
 Collège Iris 1 Abobo
 Collège Iris 2 Avocatier
 Collège Moderne Descartes
 COLLÈGE LES PINGOUINS ABOBO SOGEFIHA
 fUSOS Cours Sociaux Abobo
 Collège ibc abobo
 Collège Abraham Agneby Abobo
 Collège Saint Étienne Abobo
 Collège Sainte Camille
 Collège Saint Viateur
 Collège la Pérouse 
 Collège le Figuier 
 Collège Thanon Namanko
 Collège Commandant Cousteau
 Collège Sainte Camille 
 École Nouvelle Ivoirienne Cocody Angré. [ENICA]

Note :  Here "French school" means a school approved by the French Ministry of National Education, as part of an agreement or convention with the Agency for French Education Abroad (AEFE)

Public lycées
(Upper secondary schools, equivalent of British sixth form colleges or North American high schools)
 Lycée Municipal de Bonoua
 Lycée Moderne de Bonoua
 Lycée Aimé Césaire
 Lycée de garçons de Bingerville
 
 Lycée Hôtelier d'Abidjan
 Lycée Mamie Faitai de Bingerville
 Lycée moderne de jeunes filles de Yopougon
 Lycée moderne de Angré
 Lycée moderne Le Mahou
 Lycée technique d'Abidjan
 Lycée municipal d'Adjamé
 Lycée municipal de Marcory
 Lycée municipal Pierre Gadié de Yopougon 
 Lycée moderne Yopougon-Andokoi
 Lycée municipal d'Attécoubé
 Lycée technique de Yopougon
 Lycée municipal de Koumassi
 Lycée moderne de Koumassi
 Lycée municipal de Port-Bouët
 Lycée moderne de Port-Bouët
 Lycée moderne d Adjamé 220 logements 
 Lycée municipal Simone Ehivet Gbagbo de Niangon (LMSEGN)
 Lycée municipal d'Abobo LyMuA
 Lycée moderne 1 d'Abobo LyMA 1
 Lycée moderne 2 d'Abobo LyMA 2
 Lycée moderne I de Bondoukou
 Lycée moderne II de Bondoukou
 Lycee moderne Adjamé Harris
 Lycée moderne Nangui Abrogoua 1
 Lycée moderne Nangui Abrogoua 2
 Lycée moderne de Treichville
 Lycée Sainte Marie de Cocody

Private lycées
 Institut LKM de yopougon
 La Farandole Internationale, établissement du réseau de la Mission laïque française
 
 Collège International Jean Mermoz d’Abidjan French school, primary to terminale (end of lycée) - Closed from November 2004-September 2014, now a part of Lycée international Jean-Mermoz
 Lycée Blaise-Pascal d'Abidjan
 Commandant Cousteau (Cocody 2 Plateaux) 
 Cours Loko
 Lycée Saint Viateur d'Abidjan
 Lycée Ajavon
 Cours Castaing
 CSM Cocody
 CSM John Wesley
 CSM Plateau
 CSM Yopougon
  John Wesley
 Lycée Offoumou yapo, yopougon
 Lycée La Colombe
 Institut Voltaire Marcory
 Groupe scolaire Thanon Namanko
 Lycée Sainte-Thérèse de Koumassi
  de Treichville
 Collège Saint Viateur d'Abidjan
 Institut scolaire Lavoisier
 Institut Froebel
 Cours secondaire catholique de Yopougon (moyen séminaire)
 Institut Libanais d'Enseignement (I.L.E.)
 Groupe Scolaire Les LAUREADESab et BT
Groupe marie auzey/ENICA ecole nouvelle ivoirienne cocody angre (bac g1, g2, ...)

Tertiary education

Public tertiary institutions

 Ecole Supérieure Africaine des Technologies de l'Information et de la Communication
 
 École supérieure des professions immobilières 
 Centre ivoirien de recherche et d'études juridiques
 Centre universitaire professionnalisé d'Abidjan
 
   
 
 
  (Abobo Adjamé)
 Université Alassane Ouattara (Bouaké)
 Université Félix Houphouët-Boigny (Cocody)
  (Korhogo)

Private tertiary institutions
 École Supérieure d’interprétariat et de Traduction (ESIT)
 Institut LKM de yopougon
 
 Académie régionale des sciences et techniques de la mer
 Académie universitaire internationale des sciences sociales (AUNIS)
 
 Centre international de formation à distance
 École des métiers de la communication (EFAP) 
 
 École pratique de la chambre de commerce et d'industrie de Côte d'Ivoire
 
 
 ESPI Côte d'Ivoire (École supérieure des professions immobilières située à Cocody les II Plateaux)
 Faculté universitaire privée d'Abidjan (FUPA)
 Gecos Formation
 Institut Offoumou d'enseignement supérieur (IESTO) à Yopougon
 Institut de Communication de Gestion et d'Etudes Scientifiques  (ICOGES Abidjan et Plateau) à la Riviera 9 kilo  et Plateau
 Institut Voltaire de l'Enseignement Supérieur Technique et Professionnel (IVESTP) à Marcory 
 Groupe CSI Pôle Polytechnique (Riviera Bonoumin)
 Groupe Écoles d'Ingénieurs HETEC 
 Groupe École Entreprise Emploi (Groupe 3E)  (Plateau Immeuble GYAM second floor)
 Groupe ESCGE du Plateau
 Groupe Sup'Management Réseau Universitaire Intercontinental Libre (Deux Plateaux Les Vallons)
 Groupe E.T.S-EDUFOR
 Université Nord-Sud
 
 Institut supérieur des carrières juridiques et judiciaires (Riviera 2 Cocody)
 INSTEC (école de commerce)
  (IST-CI)
  (IUA)
 IPAG
 
 
  (UST-CI)
 Université française d'Abidjan
 
 Université internationale des sciences sociales Hampate-Ba 
 Université Adama Sanogo d'Abidjan
 Université tertiaire et technologique  LOKO (UTT LOKO)
 Université de l'atlantique
 École Spéciale du Bâtiment et des Travaux Publics (ESBTP)
 Université Internationale Privée d'Abidjan (UIPA)
 Institut Supérieur d'Ingénierie et de Santé (ISIS- Abidjan Cocody-II Plateaux)
 Institut Supérieur de Technologie Dubass (IST-DUBASS, Riviera-Faya, Abidjan)

References

Abidjan Schools
Abidjan Schools
Abidjan
Schools